The 1946 New Hampshire Wildcats football team was an American football team that represented the University of New Hampshire as a member of the Yankee Conference during the 1946 college football season. In its first year under head coach Bill Glassford, the team compiled a 6–1–1 record, outscoring their opponents 161–45. The team played its home games at Lewis Field (also known as Lewis Stadium) in Durham, New Hampshire.

Due to World War II, the Wildcats had not fielded a team in 1945. With the exception of a four-game limited schedule played in 1944, this was the first football season for the Wildcats since 1942, and their first eight-game season since 1941.

Schedule

Wildcat Carmen Ragonese, selected by the Boston Yanks in the 1948 NFL Draft, was a 1982 inductee to the university's athletic hall of fame. One of his 1946 highlights was an endzone-to-endzone interception return against Rhode Island State; reported as 101 yards in contemporary newspapers, it still stands as a Wildcat record, listed by the university as 104 yards.

Notes

References

New Hampshire
New Hampshire Wildcats football seasons
New Hampshire Wildcats football